Da Mao (born September 1, 2008) is a giant panda that was born at the Chengdu Research Base of Giant Panda Breeding. He was born to Fu Wa (female) and Xiongbing (male). The name Da Mao means "first of Mao" as he was his mother's first born.

Da Mao was brought to Canada in 2013 as part of a 10-year contract between the federal governments of Canada and China. He and his female counterpart Er Shun was supposed to spend five years at Toronto Zoo and Calgary Zoo respectively. In May 2020, the Calgary Zoo requested that both pandas be returned to China due to the difficulty of importing bamboo during the COVID-19 pandemic.

While in Toronto, Da Mao was the subject of multiple viral videos featuring him playing in the snow. The most popular featured his playful destruction of a snowman made for him by his keepers for behavioral enrichment.

See also
 List of giant pandas

References

Individual giant pandas
2008 animal births
Individual animals in Canada